The seniors' division of the UAAP Season 71 volleyball tournaments opened December 6, 2008. Tournament host will be Far Eastern University. Tournament games will be at the Far Eastern University Gym and The Arena in San Juan.

The juniors' division tournaments were held on the first semester of the 2008-09 school year; the UE Pages and the UST Lady Tiger Cubs won all of their elimination round games in their respective divisions to clinch the championship outright.

In the men's tournament, the UST Growling Tigers also won all of their elimination round games but went through the usual the Final Four format; they beat Ateneo in three straight sets in the semifinals to formalize their entry to the Finals; they then swept the UP Fighting Maroons 2–0 in the best-of-3 Finals series without losing a set to have an immaculate 17–0 Season 71 record to successfully defend their championship.

In the women's tournament, the FEU Lady Tamaraws and La Salle Lady Archers emerged on top of the standings and beat their semifinals opponents to meet in the Finals. FEU overcame UST Tigresses which gave them their opening day loss, while La Salle beat the Adamson Lady Falcons in a rematch of their third-place playoff in the Shakey's V-League. FEU and La Salle split their elimination round games, with La Salle winning over FEU in the second round's last game to wrest the #1 seed away from the Lady Tamaraws who had held it all tournament long. After winning Game 1 in five sets, FEU lost the next two games in four sets to award La Salle their fifth UAAP women's volleyball championship.

Men's tournament

Elimination round
With UST's 14–0 sweep of the tournament, they were supposed to receive at least an automatic Finals berth but instead will go through the usual Final Four phase with the release of the playoffs schedule.

Team standings 

Tiebreakers:
UP defeated Ateneo 3–2 in the third-seed game.
Adamson defeated FEU in both of their elimination round games.

Schedule

Bracket

Third-seed playoff

Semifinals

UST vs. Ateneo

|-
!colspan=10|UST advances to the Finals

La Salle vs. UP

|-
!colspan=10|UP advances to the Finals

Finals

|-
!colspan=10|UST wins series 2–0

Awards
Rookie of the Year:  Duane Craig Teves (Ateneo de Manila University)
Best Attacker:   Jayson Ramos (University of Santo Tomas)
Best Blocker:  Lloyd Arden Belgado (University of the Philippines Diliman)
Best Setter:  Gerald Magtoto (University of the Philippines Diliman)
Best Server:  Ray Karl Dimaculangan (University of Santo Tomas)
Best Receiver:  Henry James Pecaña (University of Santo Tomas)
Best Digger:  Bernardino Lorenz Casanova (De La Salle University)
Most Valuable Player:  Ray Karl Dimaculangan (University of Santo Tomas)

Women's tournament

Elimination round

Team standings 
Tiebreakers:
UST defeated Adamson 3–0 in the third-seed game.

Schedule

Bracket

Third-seed playoff

Semifinals

La Salle vs. Adamson

|-
!colspan=10|La Salle advances to the Finals

FEU vs. UST

|-
!colspan=10|FEU advances to the Finals

Finals

|-
!colspan=10|La Salle wins series 2–1

Awards
Rookie of the Year: Melissa Gohing (De La Salle University)
Best Scorer: Aiza Maizo (University of Santo Tomas)
Best Attacker: Aiza Maizo (University of Santo Tomas)
Best Blocker: Jacqueline Alarca (De La Salle University)
Best Setter: April Linor Jose (Far Eastern University)
Best Server: Macaila Irish May Morada (Far Eastern University)
Best Receiver: Manilla Santos (De La Salle University)
Best Digger: Lizlee Ann Gata-Pantone (Adamson University)
Most Valuable Player: Manilla Santos (De La Salle University)

Boys' tournament
With UE sweeping the elimination round, they were declared automatic champions and the playoffs were scrapped.

Elimination round

Team standings
Host team in boldface.

Last game of the eliminations

UE wins the championship by sweeping the tournament.

Awardees
Most Valuable Player: Michael Reyes (UE)
Rookie of the Year: Karl Roque (UE)

Girls' tournament
With UST sweeping the elimination round, they were declared automatic champions and the playoffs were scrapped.

Elimination round
Host team in boldface.

Awardees
Most Valuable Player: Alyssa Valdez (UST)
Rookie of the Year: Jelly Buan (UST)

References

2008 in Philippine sport
2008 in volleyball
2009 in Philippine sport
2009 in volleyball
UAAP Season 71
UAAP volleyball tournaments